Miglena Markova (born 16 February 1983 in Sofia) is a Bulgarian rower. Along with Anet-Jacqueline Buschmann she finished 4th in the women's double sculls at the 2004 Summer Olympics.

References 
 
 

1983 births
Living people
Bulgarian female rowers
Rowers from Sofia
Rowers at the 2004 Summer Olympics
Olympic rowers of Bulgaria
World Rowing Championships medalists for Bulgaria